Marjorie Bloch (born 1956) is an Irish painter who currently lives and works in Belfast, Northern Ireland. She was educated at Ulster University and Queen's University Belfast.

Her work can be found in the Ulster Museum collections and she exhibited in the Royal Ulster Academy (Belfast); the Royal Hibernian Academy (Dublin); and the Royal Academy of Arts (London). She had a solo exhibition, "As Above So Below", at the Engine Room Gallery, Belfast, in 2017.

References 

1956 births
Living people
20th-century Irish women artists
21st-century Irish women artists
Alumni of Ulster University
Alumni of Queen's University Belfast